Argalista fluctuata is a species of small sea snail with calcareous opercula, a marine gastropod mollusk in the family Colloniidae.

Description
The small, rather solid shell is spirally striated. It is not iridescent. Its colour is yellowish white or pale brownish with irregular waved longitudinal bands of brown, which are rather indistinct. The spire is depressed and obtuse. The shell contains four whorls. They are rounded and distinctly and closely spirally grooved. The umbilical region is smooth. The suture is scarcely impressed. The narrow umbilicus is deep. The aperture is subrotund. The peristome is acute and not continuous. The lower lip is thickened. The rather thick, white operculum is subcalcareous. It is round and translucent. It contains about six slowly increasing whorls.

Distribution
This marine species is endemic to New Zealand.

References

External links
 To World Register of Marine Species
 Homalopoma (Argalista) fluctuata (Hutton, 1883)
 Bruce A. Marshall, Molluscan and brachiopod taxa introduced by F. W. Hutton in The New Zealand journal of science; Journal of the Royal Society of New Zealand, Volume 25, Issue 4, 1995

Colloniidae
Gastropods described in 1883